Dezmin Lewis (born December 5, 1992) is a former American football wide receiver. He was drafted by the Buffalo Bills in the seventh round of the 2015 NFL Draft. He played college football at Central Arkansas.

College career
Lewis played at Central Arkansas from 2011 to 2014. He had 197 receptions for 2,668 yards and 24 touchdowns during his career with the Bears.

Professional career
Lewis was drafted by the Buffalo Bills in the seventh round with the 234th overall pick of the 2015 NFL Draft. On September 4, 2015, he was released by the Bills. On September 6, 2015, the Bills signed Lewis to their practice squad.

On September 2, 2016, Lewis was released by the Bills as part of final roster cuts and was signed to their practice squad. He was promoted to the active roster on November 29, 2016.

On September 2, 2017, Lewis was waived by the Bills.

International competition
Lewis represented the United States at the 2022 World Games, playing on the US's men's flag football team where he won a gold medal.

References

External links
Central Arkansas Bears bio 

1992 births
Living people
Sportspeople from the Dallas–Fort Worth metroplex
People from Mesquite, Texas
Players of American football from Texas
American football wide receivers
Buffalo Bills players
Central Arkansas Bears football players
World Games gold medalists
Competitors at the 2022 World Games